This is a list of Muhaxhir Albanians that includes Albanians and Muslims that left their homes as refugees or were transferred from various States in Balkan to Albania and Kosovo. The list is sorted by the fields or occupations in which the notable individual has maintained the most influence.

History and politics
Nexhmije Hoxha – Albanian Communist politician
Kostandin Boshnjaku –  Albanian banker, politician, diplomat
Murad Toptani –  Albanian poet, artist and activist of the Albanian National Awakening
Koçi Xoxe –  Albanian politician
Javer Hurshiti –   Albanian military and political figure
Musine Kokalari –  Albanian prose writer and politician
Adem Grabovci –  Kosovar-Albanian politician and a secretary of the Democratic Party of Kosovo
Glauk Konjufca –  Albanian politician
Ramiz Alia –  Albanian politician
Lulzim Basha –  Albanian politician
Shpëtim Idrizi –  Albanian politician
Elia, Crown Princess of Albania –  Albanian actress, former singer and wife of Leka II, Crown Prince of Albania
Eqrem Çabej –  Albanian historical linguist and scholar

Arts and Entertainment
Marie Kraja –    Albanian singer
Musine Kokalari –    Albanian prose writer
Tefta Tashko-Koço –  Albanian singer and soprano
Lola Gjoka –  Albanian pianist
Yllka Mujo –  Albanian actress
Rona Nishliu –    Albanian Kosovar singer and songwriter
Tinka Kurti –     Albanian actress
 Xhesika Berberi –    Albanian model

Business
Gazmend Demi – Albanian businessman who is the current president of Partizani.
Enver Sekiraqa – former Albanian businessman and criminal.
Armand Duka – Businessman and head of the Albanian Football Association

Sport
Milot Rashica – Kosovo-Albanian footballer
Ermir Lenjani –    Albanian footballer
Edon Zhegrova –  Albanian footballer
Bajram Jashanica – Kosovo-Albanian footballer
Leart Paqarada – Kosovo-Albanian footballer
Liridon Kalludra – Kosovo-Albanian footballer
Granit Xhaka – Swiss-Albanian footballer
Taulant Xhaka – Albanian footballer
Anel Rashkaj – Kosovo-Albanian footballer

References

Lists of Albanian people